Nikolai G. Petrusevich (1838–1880) was a Russian general, geologist, geographer, and scientist, notable for being a humanitarian officer in the Russian Army and a geographer of Afghanistan.  He is credited with discovering the Sarygamysh Depression in 1876.  He died at the siege of Dengil Teppe.

Military career

In 1865, as captain, he took up service with the Karachai, where he learned the local language, the local customs, abolished serfdom, organized schools for gifted children, and even helped Muslims make their pilgrimage.

In the early 1870s, when he was just a colonel, he was active in Turkey.  He called the Ottoman Empire "rascals and thieves," because they had been merely enslaving exploiters of "Khivans, Bokharans, Persians."  On the other hand, he also criticized the Russian Army for barbarism and cruelty, writing...

Petrusevich also acted in a scientific capacity for the Russian Army, surveying the northern Afghanistan border.

References 

Russian generals
Russian explorers
Russian geographers
Russian geologists
1838 births
1880 deaths